Sayyid Shah Mardan Shah-II widely known as Pir of Pagaro VII , (22 November 1928 – 10 January 2012) was the spiritual leader of Hurs and president of political party Pakistan Muslim League (F). He was commonly known in Pakistan as Pir Sahib Pagara and Pir Shaab. He was an influential figure in Pakistani politics and the leader of Hur Force in Pakistan who also participated in the Indo-Pakistani War of 1965. He was also a first-class cricketer. He died on 10 January 2012 in London, due to liver infection.

Personal life 
Pir Pagara is a title given to the leader of the Muslim Sufi order of Hurs in Sindh province of Pakistan. It comes from the Persian word "Pir" (elder or "saint") and the Sindhi word "Pagaro", which means Chieftain's Turban. The seventh Pir Pagara was Pir Syed Mardan Shah II. He was born in Pir Jo Goth, Sindh in 1928. Pir Pagara spent a major part of his life engaged in Pakistan's politics. His father Pir Sayyid Sibghatullah Shah II was hanged on 20 March 1943 by the colonial government due to his involvement in the Hur Movement.

Political career 
After the defeat of Mohtarma Fatima Jinnah by Ayub Khan in the presidential contest, Mohtarma declared the Muslim League functional and made Pir Pagaro the head of Muslim League. He was nominated as the first president of the United Muslim League as well. He was Chief of Pakistan Muslim League-Functional (PML-F), and spiritual leader of the 'Hur' jamaat. He was one of the most influential and respected political personalities of Pakistan. His predictions on Pakistan's politics were sometimes quoted in the media. He was usually visited by many senior politicians of Pakistan such as Sheikh Rasheed, Chaudhry Shujaat, Raza Haroon and Shah Mehmood Qureshi.

Cricket
Usually referred to in cricket literature as the Pir of Pagaro, he was influential in the early years of Pakistan's cricket development in the 1950s. Before Pakistan's first tour of England in 1954 he had a grass pitch constructed in his garden so that the Pakistan players, who had to play most of their cricket at the time on matting pitches, could practise in something similar to English conditions. He re-founded the Sind Cricket Association, captained Sind in the first-ever match in the Quaid-e-Azam Trophy in November 1953, and organized and captained a team under his name against the MCC in 1955-56.

Death 
Pir Pagara was admitted to Aga Khan University Hospital (AKUH) on 24 November 2011, for the treatment of infected lungs. According to doctors, he was in a very serious condition and was therefore put on a ventilator and flown to London on a special air ambulance on 5 January, along with a physician and family members.

He died on 10 January 2012 of a liver infection. His body was returned to Pakistan on the following day. Many political parties in Pakistan, including the Hurs, sent their condolences to the family. He was buried in his native Pir Jo Goth village alongside his ancestors.

He was succeeded by his son Syed Sibghatullah Shah Rashdi III, known informally as Raja Saeen', both as the Pir Pagara and leader of Pakistan Muslim League (F).

See also 
 Sibghatullah Shah Rashidi
 Hurs

References

External links 
 Pir Pagara Passes Away
 Pir Pagara to head united Muslim League
 Pir Pagara website 
 Pir Sahib Pagara in London Hospital Video
 Pir Pagara dead Body Video
 Pir Pagaro IV's cricket profile

 

 

1928 births
2012 deaths
Deaths from liver disease
Pagara family
Pakistan Muslim League (F) politicians
Pakistani cricketers
Pakistani hunters
Pakistani political party founders
Pakistani religious leaders
Pakistani Sufis
Pakistani Sunni Muslims
Politicians from Karachi
Sindh cricketers
Sindhi people